Conophorus melanoceratus is a species of bee flies in the family Bombyliidae.

References

Further reading

External links

 Diptera.info

Bombyliidae
Insects described in 1892
Taxa named by Jacques-Marie-Frangile Bigot